Aspire to Innovate (a2i) of the ICT Division and the Cabinet Division supported by UNDP, a special programme of the government’s Digital Bangladesh agenda, is a key driver of the nation’s goal of becoming a developed country by 2041 and in achieving the 2030 Sustainable Development Goals. a2i leverages and facilitates public service innovation to ensure digital transformation of the public sector and its citizen-centered approach has taken a number of services to the doorsteps of citizens to improve their livelihoods.

History
The programme is part of Vision 2021, a political manifesto of the Bangladesh Awami League party before winning the National Elections of 2008 to facilitate digital transformation in the country. Abdul Mannan PAA is the present Project Director and Anir Chowdhury is the policy adviser to the a2i Programme. The Programme aims to provide information to the citizens per "Right to Information Act of 2009" and bring about a change in the Bangladesh Civil Service to a citizen-centric service delivery system.

On 27 December 2020, a2i launched Ek-Shop along with e-Commerce Association of Bangladesh to facilitate online shopping for 10 thousand members of the organization. In 2020 a2i won its seventh consecutives award the World Summit on the Information Society.

References

Government agencies of Bangladesh
Politics of Bangladesh
Civil service in Bangladesh
Government agencies established in 2007
2007 establishments in Bangladesh